Khong-e Taheri (also Romanized as Khong-e Ţāherī and Khong Ţāherī; also known as Khong) is a village in Rostam-e Do Rural District, in the Central District of Rostam County, Fars Province, Iran. At the 2006 census, its population was 63, in 15 families.

References 

Populated places in Rostam County